The 1992 Moldovan Cup was the first season of the Moldovan annual football cup competition. The competition ended with the final held on 9 May 1992.

Round of 16

|}

Quarter-finals

|}

Semi-finals

|}

Final

References
 

Moldovan Cup seasons
Moldovan Cup
Moldova